Gamochaeta coarctata, the gray everlasting, is a species of flowering plant in the family Asteraceae. It is widespread in South America (from Colombia to Uruguay) and naturalized in parts of Eurasia, Australia, and North America.

The plant forms many small flower heads in elongated arrays. Each head contains 2–4 yellow disc flowers but no ray flowers.

Some specimens collected in the United States were formerly misidentified as G. americana, which does not grow in the United States.

References

External links
photo of herbarium specimen at Missouri Botanical Garden, collected in Peru in 1973

coarctata
Flora of South America
Plants described in 1803